iWantTFC is a Filipino over-the-top content platform and production company owned and operated by ABS-CBN Digital Media, a division of ABS-CBN Corporation, formed in 2020 through the merger of two streaming services iWant and TFC Online. In addition to offering on-demand contents of ABS-CBN, iWantTFC also live streams linear channels such as Kapamilya Channel, TeleRadyo, Knowledge Channel, FashionTV, A8 ESports, and Black Belt.

The service is available worldwide, primarily catering to a Filipino audience. The service is also a replacement for Sky On Demand of Sky Cable on September 1, 2020.

History

As ABS-CBNnow! (2003-2010)
Launched in 2003 as ABS-CBNnow!, a service primarily focusing to the overseas Filipino workers where they can watch ABS-CBN programs such as MTB, The Buzz and Magandang Gabi Bayan anywhere in the world using a PC with high-speed Internet or broadband connection. Users can stream directly or download files and are required to install Windows Media Player in order to view contents which are DRM protected. It is one of the first Filipino owned OTT platform. As of October 2005, there are approximately 23,000 subscribers worldwide. The biggest share of its subscribers comes from the United States with 8,000, another 6,000 in the United Kingdom, 4,000 in Canada, and the rest in Korea, Japan, the Philippines and other Asian countries.

iWant TV (2010-2018)
From its launch until 2015, iWant TV had foreign contents from many pan-regional television channels such as NatGeo, the Food Network, E!, CNN, and Cartoon Network. These particular contents are now diverted into a new service called Sky On Demand which is exclusive to Sky subscribers.
In August 2015, iWant TV, together with StarFlix (a division of Star Cinema) and Wattpad, released Must Date the Playboy, starring Kim Chiu, Xian Lim and directed by Mae Cruz Alviar, the first movie to be released exclusively through iWant TV and ABS-CBN Mobile service.

On September 26, 2016, a partnership with PLDT and its subsidiary Smart Communications was announced during a signing ceremony attended by Eugenio Lopez III (Chairman of ABS-CBN), Carlo Katigbak (President and CEO of ABS-CBN), Manny Pangilinan (Chairman of PLDT) and other ABS-CBN, PLDT and Smart executives. The partnership will enable PLDT and Smart customers to access the iWant TV website and mobile apps.

In 2018, iWant TV began streaming Filipino-dubbed Japanese anime series and movies that aired on ABS-CBN's original channel, starting with the hit anime film Your Name.

As iWant (2018-2020)

On November 16, 2018, the service officially relaunched as iWant, which now emphasizes on adding original content similar to Netflix and Iflix, featuring Spirits: Reawaken (a reboot version of the original 2004–2005 TV series), Quezon's Game, and Alamat ng Ano. Glorious and MA were the first two iWant original movies.
In May 2019, the service adds the 2005 version of the Japanese animé series Doraemon (which airs on Yey!, an exclusive channel of ABS-CBN TV Plus), becoming the second animé title to be streamed on iWant.

A television special called iWant Originals premiered on ABS-CBN's Yes Weekend! Sunday evening block on August 11, 2019, replacing the 14-year-old comedy gag show Goin' Bulilit. Some scenes were edited for the TV version due to strict guidelines of the MTRCB. On August 18, Call Me Tita was the first original series to premiere simultaneously on both iWant and ABS-CBN. iWant Originals was cancelled on September 22, 2019, to give way for the Kapamilya Super Blockbusters movie block.

On March 16, 2020, iWant Originals returned on ABS-CBN's Primetime Bida as part of the special TV programming due to the Enhanced community quarantine in Luzon caused by the COVID-19 pandemic in the Philippines. iWant Originals showcased some of their fresh, most-watched programs. In the list are; Julia Barretto's mystery-thriller I Am U, making it the lead miniseries, followed by Jodi Sta. Maria's My Single Lady and Joseph Marco's Uncoupling.

Various iWant Originals series airs weekdays on The Filipino Channel, a global subscription television network owned and operated by ABS-CBN. Each series or part of a mini-series will be replaced by another iWant Originals series. Beginning with Past, Present, Perfect? which aired on May 4, 2020; followed by Taiwan That You Love on May 12; My Single Lady on May 20; Uncoupling on May 28; The End: Balikbayan on June 5; Spirits: Reawaken on June 8; The End: Accidental Friend on June 26; Bagman on June 29; Touchscreen:Wittyrella; Touchscreen:It's A Match; Bagman: New Season; The End: Third Wheel on July 30; Alamat ng Ano on August 3; HIGH on August 17; Ang Babae sa Septic Tank 3: The Real Untold Story of Josephine Bracken on August 27; Jhon en Martian on September 7, as part of the special TV programming due to the COVID-19 pandemic. On the weekends, TNT Boys: Journey to the World Stage, a documentary series airing on June 6, 2020. Also, another documentary series Unlisted, airing in July 2020. iWant Originals ended on September 25, 2020.

iWant also streamed Pantawid ng Pag-ibig: At Home Together Concert on March 22, 2020, together with ABS-CBN, S+A, ANC, Jeepney TV, DZMM Radyo Patrol 630, DZMM Teleradyo, Metro Channel, Myx, Asianovela Channel, and TFC. The concert was aimed to help the people who were in need because of the community quarantine in Luzon and the COVID-19 pandemic.

As iWantTFC (2020-present)
On September 1, 2020, iWant merged with TFC Online and was soft launched as iWantTFC. The service inherited the worldwide accessibility of the latter service. TFC IPTV and TFC Direct via cable and satellite subscribers have instant online access to iWantTFC with TFC Everywhere (TVE) feature. They also made iWantTFC's full library accessible for free for users in the Philippines.

Content

iWantTFC stores over 10,000 hours of content and programs, over 1,000 films, and several live on-demand channels and video on demand. Most of its content and films are produced by ABS-CBN Corporation's divisions such as ABS-CBN Entertainment and ABS-CBN Films. In addition, there are over 20 original films and over 50 original series produced by iWantTFC.

The platform also provides live streams of several of ABS-CBN's broadcast properties, some operated by ABS-CBN's subsidiaries Creative Programs, Inc. and ABS-CBN international. Kapamilya Channel, ABS-CBN TeleRadyo, and Knowledge Channel are exclusively available in the Philippines. The Filipino Channel, ANC Global, ABS-CBN TeleRadyo, Cinema One Global, Cine Mo! Global, MOR Entertainment and Myx America are available in North America.

Notes

References

External links

ABS-CBN Digital Media
Philippine entertainment websites
Video on demand services
Streaming television
2003 establishments in the Philippines
Internet properties established in 2003
Assets owned by ABS-CBN Corporation